In mathematics, a series or integral is said to be conditionally convergent if it converges, but it does not converge absolutely.

Definition
More precisely, a series of real numbers  is said to converge conditionally if 
 exists (as a finite real number, i.e. not  or ), but 

Bernhard Riemann proved that a conditionally convergent series may be rearranged to converge to any value at all, including ∞ or −∞; see Riemann series theorem. The Lévy–Steinitz theorem identifies the set of values to which a series of terms in Rn can converge.

See also
Absolute convergence
Unconditional convergence

References
 Walter Rudin, Principles of Mathematical Analysis (McGraw-Hill: New York, 1964).

Mathematical series
Integral calculus
Convergence (mathematics)
Summability theory